Walter Milciades Fretes (born 18 May 1982) is a Paraguayan football player that usually plays as a right midfielder for Universitario de Deportes.

During his career he played for teams like Cerro Porteño, Chiapas of Mexico and Newell's Old Boys of Argentina.

External links

  Argentine Primera statistics

Living people
1982 births
Paraguayan footballers
Paraguayan Primera División players
Peruvian Primera División players
Liga MX players
Cerro Porteño players
Newell's Old Boys footballers
Chiapas F.C. footballers
Sportivo Luqueño players
Club Universitario de Deportes footballers
Club Deportivo Universidad de San Martín de Porres players
Expatriate footballers in Argentina
Expatriate footballers in Chile
Expatriate footballers in Mexico
Expatriate footballers in Peru
Paraguay under-20 international footballers
Paraguay international footballers
Paraguayan expatriate footballers
Paraguayan expatriate sportspeople in Argentina
Paraguayan expatriate sportspeople in Chile
Paraguayan expatriate sportspeople in Mexico
Paraguayan expatriate sportspeople in Peru
Association football midfielders